This is a list of the Fall 1978 PGA Tour Qualifying School graduates. There were 144 players in the field. Approximately 25 would earn playing privileges on the PGA Tour. The finals were from October 25-28 in Huntsville, Texas.

Tournament summary 
The Southeastern Regional was held at Sea Balms Golf Course in Saint Simons Island in Georgia. Among notable players in the field were Vance Heafner, Chip Beck, David Canipe, and David Eger. After the first round Beck of Fayetteville, North Carolina took the first round lead with a 65. Skip Dunaway of Charlotte, North Carolina was one shot behind.

Jim Thorpe was back at q-school after losing playing privileges on the PGA Tour. He earned co-medallist honors with John Fought.

List of graduates 

Source:

References

1978 2
PGA Tour Qualifying School Graduates
PGA Tour Qualifying School Graduates